Stanford Bermond Routt (born July 26, 1983) is a former American football cornerback. After playing college football for Houston, he was drafted by the Oakland Raiders in the second round of the 2005 NFL Draft. He played for the Raiders for seven seasons from 2005 to 2011. He also played for the Kansas City Chiefs and Houston Texans.

Early years
Routt attended John B. Connally High School in Austin, Texas, and was a two-sport standout in both football and track. In track, he was a unanimous All-District selection, as well as an All-America selection, and was also a state qualifier in both the 200 meter dash and the 4 × 400 metres relay team. As a junior, he ran the ninth-fastest 200-meter dash in the nation.

College career
At the University of Houston, Routt excelled in indoor track and outdoor track as well as football. Routt eventually returned to University of Houston where he earned his Bachelor of Science degree in kinesiology with a concentration in sports administration in 2011.

Track and field
Stanford Routt earned NCAA Outdoor All-America honors after placing third in the 200 meters at the 2003 NCAA Outdoor Track Meet. Routt was named the Indoor Track Athlete of the Year by Conference USA in 2004 after winning the 60-meter and 200-meter dashes. Those wins eventually qualified Routt to compete in the 60-meter and 200-meter dashes at the NCAA Indoor Championship. Routt is a two-time champion in the 200 meters at the NCAA Midwest Regional Championships.

Personal bests

Professional career

2005 NFL Draft
At the 2005 NFL Scouting Combine, Routt ran the fastest 40-yard dash at a time of 4.27 seconds, the fastest time since the NFL used electronic timing. His record was broken by running back Chris Johnson with a time of 4.24 seconds in 2008.

Oakland Raiders
Routt was drafted by the Oakland Raiders in the second round (38th overall) of the 2005 NFL Draft.

After limited action the first two weeks of the 2007 season due to a knee injury, Routt started the remainder of the season as the second cornerback alongside Nnamdi Asomugha.

Routt re-entered the starting lineup in 2010 after being tendered at the highest level (1st and 3rd round level) by the Raiders as a restricted free agent in the offseason. He had his best statistical year to date with 55 tackles, one tackle-for-loss, 15 pass deflections, one forced fumble, two interceptions, and one touchdown. In week 17, Routt recorded his second interception on the season for his first career touchdown. He had the second-lowest "burn rate" of all cornerbacks in 2010, with only 39.4% of passes completed that were thrown to receivers he covered.

The Raiders re-signed Routt to a three-year, $31.5 million contract on February 24, 2011, to remain in Oakland. The contract included a guaranteed $20 million over the first two years. Routt agreed to restructure his contract to aid the team's salary cap on August 4.

Following the 2011 season in which Routt started 15 games and recorded four interceptions, the Raiders released him on February 9, 2012.

Kansas City Chiefs
Routt signed a three-year, $19.6 million contract with the Kansas City Chiefs on February 20, 2012. On November 5, 2012, Routt was released by the Chiefs.

Houston Texans
On December 4, 2012, Routt had a workout with the Houston Texans. Routt signed with the team on the same day.

NFL statistics

Key
 GP: games played
 COMB: combined tackles
 TOTAL: total tackles
 AST: assisted tackles
 SACK: sacks
 FF: forced fumbles
 FR: fumble recoveries
 FR YDS: fumble return yards 
 INT: interceptions
 IR YDS: interception return yards
 AVG IR: average interception return
 LNG: longest interception return
 TD: interceptions returned for touchdown
 PD: passes defensed

References

External links
 
 Oakland Raiders bio

1983 births
Living people
Players of American football from Austin, Texas
American football cornerbacks
Houston Cougars football players
Oakland Raiders players
Kansas City Chiefs players
Houston Texans players